Mawkynrew Legislative Assembly constituency is one of the 60 Legislative Assembly constituencies of Meghalaya state in India.

It is part of East Khasi Hills district and is reserved for candidates belonging to the Scheduled Tribes.

Members of the Legislative Assembly

Election results

2018

See also
 List of constituencies of the Meghalaya Legislative Assembly
 East Khasi Hills district

References

East Khasi Hills district
Assembly constituencies of Meghalaya